The Gold Coaster is a steel roller coaster operating at Dreamworld. The roller coaster is one of the tallest in the Southern Hemisphere, after originally being the tallest when it was first built. Designed by Arrow Dynamics, built in Melbourne by Able Leisure Pty. Ltd the ride was originally installed at Luna Park Sydney in 1995 as the Big Dipper before being sold and relocated to Dreamworld on the Gold Coast in 2001. When it was brought to Dreamworld, the ride was the first roller coaster to be opened on the Gold Coast since 1997. The roller coaster was named Cyclone from 2001 until 2015 when it was refurbished and named Hot Wheels SideWinder as part of the new Motorsport Experience themed land from 2015 to 2020.

History

Construction
The steel roller coaster, designed by Arrow Dynamics, was constructed by Able Leisure Pty Ltd in Newport Melbourne at a cost of A$8,000,000 during the 1994 redevelopment of Luna Park Sydney. Construction of the ride used over 1,000 tons of steel and 15,000 sets of nuts and bolts.

Luna Park era
Opening in 1995, the new roller coaster became a point of contention with residents, and was cited as the main example of the noise pollution generated by the amusement park. After appeals to various courts by both the "resident action group" and the park's new owners, it was decreed that the roller coaster could only operate at certain times, and under strict conditions. These conditions caused major shareholder Wittingslow Amusements to consider 'walking out' on the operating company. The park's administration was doubtful of Luna Park's survival under the restrictions, and was proven correct when Luna Park closed in February 1996.
The roller coaster remained on site until late 2001, operating on several occasions for charity-supporting events, including those for the Variety Club and The Spastic Centre. Between 1996 and 2001, the roller coaster was filmed for sequences in the Mary-Kate and Ashley Olsen film Our Lips Are Sealed and for Farscape Season 3 episode Infinite Possibilities Part I: Daedalus Demands.

Developers looking to redevelop Luna Park were sold the land on the condition that the Big Dipper be sold prior to any developments.

Relocation to Dreamworld

The ride was purchased in 2001 by Macquarie Leisure Trust, the owners of Dreamworld, for A$3 million. A further A$2.5 million was spent to relocate, install and modify the roller coaster, as well as to develop the roller coaster's new theme. Several of the supports needed modifications to make them rest on the ground because they were originally located on top of a single story building. It took 136 trucks to carry the track from Luna Park Sydney to Dreamworld.

The ride reopened as the Cyclone at its new location in Dreamworld on 26 December 2001, in a ceremony dedicated by Peter Beattie and Merri Rose MPs. Dreamworld's chief executive, Tony Braxton-Smith, stated the ride was similar to being in an actual cyclone: "the name Cyclone fits the ride perfectly with lots of nail-biting twists and hair-raising turns to simulate being caught in a real cyclone". The intention of the ride's spiral queue design was to occupy patrons through both visual and physical stimuli such as theatrical lighting and shaking floors. At a point prior to 2008, the queue line was switched with the exit ramp resulting in patrons lining up on the ramp that wraps around the building, and exiting through the deactivated interior queue.

2015 refurbishment
The Cyclone closed on 12 October 2015 for a refurbishment to become part of a new Motorsport Experience precinct at Dreamworld. As part of the upgrades, the ride was fitted with a new train built by Vekoma that featured onboard audio and renamed Hot Wheels SideWinder. The Motorsport Experience precinct opened on 26 December 2015 with the refurbished roller coaster and V8 Supercars RedLine simulators, as well as a collection of Peter Brock's cars in Brock's Garage.

2020 refurbishment
 In February 2020, Dreamworld announced that the Hot Wheels Sidewinder would be given a rebranding and a refurbishment. This came alongside the retirement of the Rocky Hollow Log Ride and a refurbishment for ABC Kids World. Soon after the announcement, repainting commenced on the coaster with a new colour scheme. The tracks were painted aqua blue while the supports were painted white. The coasters new name and theme were officially announced on the morning of 20 December 2020. The ride reopened to the public later that day with a new colour scheme on both the tracks and trains along with a retheme from Hot Wheels to a circa 1970s Gold Coast theme.

Characteristics

The Gold Coaster is one of Dreamworld's seven thrill rides alongside The Claw, The Giant Drop, Mick Doohan's Motocoaster, Pandamonium, Steel Taipan and Tail Spin.

The ride is still one of the longest roller coaster in Australia.

Vehicle
The Gold Coaster consists of a single six-car train seats 24 passengers (4 passengers per car). The original trains used from 1996 to 2015 were built by Arrow Dynamics however after the 2015 refurbishment, new trains built by Vekoma were introduced. During the Hot Wheels era, the trains were themed to race cars. Since 2020, the trains are currently themed to a 1970s vintage car.

Ride experience

Queue
Riders queue inside a spiral building with a variety of circa 1970s Gold Coast theming. The entrance of the spiral building is themed to a motel. Riders then enter a hallway decorated with pastel colours before entering a room with blue LED lights. The room is decorated with surfboards and the ride's logo. Riders are then lead into the ride's station which is themed to a garage.

Ride

After exiting the station, the vehicle does a sharp turn left onto the chain lift hill. The ride then reaches its highest point before doing a small drop, turning left and going through the largest drop. The ride then goes through a series of smaller drops and turns. The ride then enters the WhiteWater World water park, interacting with several water slides, before entering two inversions towards the end of the ride - a reverse sidewinder followed by a vertical loop.

Exit
Riders are to exit through a staircase which leads to underneath the station before going up another staircase to the top of the spiral building. Guests are then to exit down the ramp in the spiral building. Guests are then to exit through the Shaka Shack gift shop. The gift shop contains souvenirs and ride photos available for purchase.

Fiscal results

In the first 6 months of the ride's release in December 2001, more than half of all visitors to Dreamworld rode the Cyclone putting its popularity above The Giant Drop and Tower of Terror, but still lagging behind Thunder River Rapids Ride and Rocky Hollow Log Ride according to Macquarie Leisure Trust, owners of Dreamworld. They clarify: "the Thunder River Rapids and the Log Ride remain the most popular attractions in the park due to their large capacity and ride frequency".

The Trust concluded that the Cyclone's success, along with the impact of social changes in Australian culture were able to offset the negative impact of the Ansett collapse and increase attendance by 6.9% and total revenue by 13.3%. They did not attribute a specific portion of this to the Cyclone itself.

Popular culture
The Gold Coaster was featured on the opening sequences of Big Brother Australia in 2002 (as Cyclone).

References

External links
 
 
Video of a passenger's point of view on the Cyclone from UK Rides

Roller coasters in Australia
Big Dipper
Roller coasters introduced in 2001
Amusement rides that closed in 2001
Roller coasters operated by Ardent Leisure
Dreamworld (Australia)